The William J. Gillett House, also known as Trinity Exchange Shop Building or William J. Gillett Residence, is a building in Syracuse, New York.  It was designed by William J. Gillett.

It was listed for its architecture.

References

Houses on the National Register of Historic Places in New York (state)
Second Empire architecture in New York (state)
Houses completed in 1877
Houses in Syracuse, New York
National Register of Historic Places in Syracuse, New York
1877 establishments in New York (state)